The Walter Beauchamp House is a historic house at 492 Prospect Avenue in Hot Springs, Arkansas.  Built in 1905, it is a "double decker" single-family house, unusual both for its setting on a spacious lot, and for the style, which is generally uncommon in Hot Springs.  Houses of this type are typically found on narrow lots in densely-built urban areas and have two units; this one is set on a larger lot similar to others in the neighborhood and has a single large unit.  Walter Beauchamp, the builder, was a conductor on the Chicago, Rock Island and Pacific Railroad.

The house was listed on the National Register of Historic Places in 1994.

See also
National Register of Historic Places listings in Garland County, Arkansas

References

Houses on the National Register of Historic Places in Arkansas
Colonial Revival architecture in Arkansas
Houses completed in 1905
Houses in Hot Springs, Arkansas
National Register of Historic Places in Hot Springs, Arkansas
Historic district contributing properties in Arkansas
1905 establishments in Arkansas